Neocuproine is a heterocyclic organic compound and chelating agent.  Phenanthroline ligands were first published in the late 19th century, and the derivatives substituted at the 2 and 9 positions are among the most studied of the modified phenanthrolines.

Synthesis and structure
Neocuproine can be prepared by sequential Skraup reactions (Doebner-Miller reaction/condensation) of o-nitroaniline (2-Nitroaniline) with crotonaldehyde diacetate.  An alternate synthesis involves the condensation of o-phenylenediamine, m-nitrobenzenesulphonate, and crotonaldehyde diacetate.  This method gives higher yields but is less economical. Neocuproine crystallizes as a dihydrate and a hemihydrate.

Coordination chemistry
In the early 1930s, phenanthroline derivatives became known for their use as colorimetric indicators for many transition metals.  Neocuproine proved to be highly selective for copper(I).  The resulting complex, [Cu(neocuproine)2]+ has a deep orange-red color. The properties of copper(I) neocuproine complexes have been widely studied, e.g. for the preparation of catenane and rotaxane complexes. The copper-catalyzed release of NO+ (nitrosonium) from S-Nitrosothiols is inhibited by neocuproine.

Relative to 1,10-phenanthroline, neocuproine bears steric bulk flanking the nitrogen donor sites.  A major consequence is that complexes of the type [M(neocuproine)3]n+ are disfavored, in contrast to the situation with phenanthroline ligands that lack substitution in the 2,9 positions.  The ligand bathocuproine is similar to neocuproine, but has phenyl substituents at the 4,7-positions.

Other metals
Platinum forms the square planar complexes [PtX2(2,9-dimethyl-1,10-phenanthroline)].

Neocuproine has also been discovered to have properties that cause fragmentation and disappearance of the melanin in adult zebrafish melanocytes.  Those expressing eGFP also have been observed to lose eGFP fluorescence in the presence of neocuproine.

References

Appendix: NMR Shifts 
The following figures contain information on the nuclear magnetic resonance spectroscopic data of neocuproine (from Chandler et al.):

Phenanthrolines